American Appeal was a weekly socialist newspaper that was published briefly in Chicago between 1926 and 1927. The paper was semi-official organ of the Socialist Party of America which was the publisher. The editor was Eugene V. Debs. In 1927 the paper merged with New Leader.

References

1926 establishments in Illinois
1927 disestablishments in Illinois
Defunct newspapers published in Chicago
Defunct weekly newspapers
Publications established in 1926
Publications disestablished in 1927
Socialist newspapers published in the United States
Weekly newspapers published in the United States
Socialism in Illinois